Insignificance is the third studio album of Taiwanese singer Hebe Tien, released on 29 November 2013 by HIM International Music and contains ten tracks. Pre-orders for the album started on 13 November 2013 and included a ticket to an exhibit curated by director and the album's visual art director Bill Chia to promote the album. The song and the whole album was conceptualized when Tien shared one of her favorite poems "Under One Small Star" to her colleague, mentioning that she was enchanted by the verses, and hoped that the lyrics for the album will showcase a similar passion. Graphic designer Aaron Nieh was employed to design the album. Both Chia and Nieh received two nominations at the 25th Golden Melody Awards for Best Music Video for "Insignificance" and Best Packaged Album, respectively.

Background 
Following Tien's second studio album My Love which received seven nominations at the 23rd Golden Melody Awards, solo endorsements, and S.H.E's first leg of their fourth concert tour 2gether 4ever which was wrapped up in Singapore on 26 October 2013, HIM International Music released a video teaser of Tien in a snowy landscape in Iceland with the numbers 20131113, narrated with an excerpt from the poem "Under One Small Star" by Polish poet and 1996 Nobel Prize in Literature recipient Wisława Szymborska. A follow up teaser was released on 1 November 2013, revealing the title of the upcoming album. During the press conference for the exhibit, Tien mentioned that she had a lot of doubts and frustrations when she debuted in her 20s, but felt her "balance" after acknowledging her "insignificance" as she learned more about the world.

Release 
On 13 November 2013, the music video for the song "Insignificance" directed by Bill Chia was released. Tien worked with Hong Kong lyricist Chow Yiu-fai for the song. The music video which was shot in a snowy setting in Iceland where Tien witnessed collapsing icebergs reinforced her realizations about her insignificance, and the importance of environmental protection. On 25 November 2013, the music video for "You Better Not Think About Me" featuring Taiwanese actor Fu Meng-po was released. Derek Shih who wrote the song "Leave Me Alone" from her debut album To Hebe worked on the lyrics.

Tien released the official track listing of the album through her Facebook on 25 November 2013, and Insignificance was officially released on 29 November 2013.

On 12 December 2019, Tien released the music video for the song "Learning From Drunk". Throughout 2014, Tien released the music videos for "Forever Love", "Contradictory", "FIckle", and "He's Gone". On 18 April 2014, Tien released the Record of Insignificance DVD which includes eight music videos and footages from the exhibit.

On 3 August 2018, an LP version of the album was released by HIM.

Promotion 
The pre-order edition of the album included a ticket for the audio-visual exhibit titled Record of Insignificance which was held on 17 November to 1 December 2013 in Songshan Cultural and Creative Park to promote the album.

On 4 December 2013, Tien held a small concert in Kaohsiung which was priced at 500 yuan per ticket, and was only open to 120 people. The event received backlash online from fans who were unable to secure their tickets, accusing HIM of cash-grabbing. Tien was hurt and shed tears during the concert. She signed autographs after the performance and personally refunded each fan's 500 yuan. It was reported that the production cost of the event is reached 100,000 yuan which is more than the total of 60,000 yuan from ticket sales. Another schedule for the mini concert was scheduled in Taichung on 20 December 2013, and in Taipei on 3 January 2014.

On 5 January 2014, Tien was invited as the unveiling ambassador for the 5th annual Chinese New Year's Eve TV special Super Star Red and White Talent Awards held in NTU Sports Center. She performed her song "LOVE!" from her debut album, and "Forever Love" and "Learning From Drunk" from the new album.

To support the album Tien kicked off her first solo concert tour "IF" on 6 December 2014 in Taipei Arena. 22,000 tickets for the two-day concert were reportedly sold out within ten minutes.

Track listing

Notes 
  track is not available in Mainland version

Personnel
Credits from the album's liner notes.

Musicians

 Hebe Tien                                                – vocals, background vocals 
 Fan Zhezhong (樊哲忠)                            – background vocals , guitar 
 Han Likang (韓立康)                             – guitar 
 JerryC                                                   – guitar, bass 
 Mellow Wang (王漢威)                            – guitar 
 Bing Wang (王治平)        – guitar 
 Xue Feng (薛峰)                                – guitar 
 Michael Ning (甯子達)           – bass 
 Huang Xianzhong (黄顯忠)                       – drums 
 Mr.Q (陳柏州)                                   – drums 
 Juju (具具)                                     – drums 
 Agwen Yu (于京延)                               – violin, cello 
 Chi Lee String Orchestra (于京延)               – strings 

Technical

 Guo Wenzong (郭文宗)                            – harmony composer 
 Bing Wang (王治平)        – harmony composer 
 Bernard Zheng (鄭楠)               – harmony composer 
 Agwen Yu (于京延)                               – strings composer 
 Martin  (馬丁)                                 – sound engineer 
 Eugene Ke  (柯宗佑)                             – sound engineer 
 Hao Yu  (郝宇)                                 – sound engineer 
 Zhao Huitao  (趙會濤)                           – sound engineer 
 Craig Burbidge                                               – mixing 
 Adam Huang                                                   – mixing 
 Dave Yang                                                    – mixing 
 Zhao Jing                                                    – mixing 
 Fan Zhezhong (樊哲忠)                           – production assistant 

Music video

 Bill Chia (比爾賈)               – director 
 Hsu Yun-Hsuan (徐筠軒)                         – director

Accolades
The song "Insignificance" is listed at number seven on Hit Fm Taiwan's Annual Top 100 Singles Chart (Hit-Fm年度百首單曲) for 2013.

References

2013 albums
Hebe Tien albums
HIM International Music albums